Delles Ray Howell (born August 22, 1948) is a retired American football defensive back. He played for the New Orleans Saints (1970–1972) and the New York Jets (1973–1975) in the National Football League. At 6'3", weighing in at 200 pounds, he was drafted by the New Orleans Saints in the 4th round (88th overall pick) in the 1970 NFL Draft out of Grambling State University. He was traded along with Richard Neal from the Saints to the Jets for a pair of 1973 picks in the second and third rounds (51st and 66th overall–Steve Baumgartner and Pete Van Valkenburg respectively) on January 29, 1973.

References

External links
Stats

1948 births
Living people
Sportspeople from Vallejo, California
American football defensive backs
Grambling State Tigers football players
New Orleans Saints players
New York Jets players
Players of American football from California